Lankabaranage Bopal Sudhira Jinasena (16 January 1906 - 19??) was a Ceylonese lawyer and politician. 

In 1956 he was elected as the second member of the Parliament of Ceylon for Kadugannawa, representing the United National Party at the 3rd parliamentary election. On 18 September 1958 he was elected the Deputy Chairman of Committees, a position he retained until 5 December 1959.

References

1906 births
Members of the 3rd Parliament of Ceylon
United National Party politicians
Sinhalese politicians
Date of death missing